{{Infobox election
| country = Norway
| type = parliamentary
| previous_election = 2001 Norwegian parliamentary election
| previous_mps = List of members of Stortinget 2005–2009
| previous_year = 2001
| next_election = 2009 Norwegian parliamentary election
| next_year = 2009
| seats_for_election = All 169 seats in the Storting
| majority_seats = 85
| election_date = 11 and 12 September 2005
| image1 = Jens Stoltenberg, Norges stasminister, under Nordisk-Baltiskt statsministermote i Reykjavik 2005.jpg
| leader1 = Jens Stoltenberg
| party1 = Norwegian Labour Party
| last_election1 = 24.29%, 43 seats
| seats1 = 61
| seat_change1 = 18
| popular_vote1 = 862,757
| percentage1 = 32.69%
| swing1 = 8.40pp
| image2 = Carl i Hagen043 2E jpg DF0000062790.jpg
| leader2 = Carl I. Hagen
| party2 = Progress Party (Norway)
| last_election2 = 14.64%, 26 seats
| seats2 = 38
| seat_change2 = 12
| popular_vote2 = 582,284
| percentage2 = 22.06%
| swing2 = 7.42pp
| image3 = Erna Solberg 2009 Party Conference.jpg
| leader3 = Erna Solberg
| party3 = Conservative Party of Norway
| last_election3 = 21.21%, 38 seats
| seats3 = 23
| seat_change3 = 15
| popular_vote3 = 372,008
| percentage3 = 14.10%
| swing3 = 7.11pp
| image4 = Kristin_Halvorsen_Sentralbanksjefens_årstale_2018_(191746).jpg
| leader4 = Kristin Halvorsen
| party4 = Socialist Left Party (Norway)
| last_election4 = 12.55%, 23 seats
| seats4 = 15
| seat_change4 = 8
| popular_vote4 = 232,971
| percentage4 = 8.83%
| swing4 = 3.72pp
| image5 = Dagfinn Hoybraten, blivande president for Nordiska radet 2007.jpg
| leader5 = Dagfinn Høybråten
| party5 = Christian Democratic Party (Norway)
| last_election5 = 12.41%, 22 seats
| seats5 = 11
| seat_change5 = 11
| popular_vote5 = 178,885
| percentage5 = 6.78%
| swing5 = 5.63pp
| image6 = Aslaug Haga.png
| leader6 = Åslaug Haga
| party6 = Centre Party (Norway)
| last_election6 = 5.56%, 10 seats
| seats6 = 11
| seat_change6 = 1
| popular_vote6 = 171,063
| percentage6 = 6.48%
| swing6 = 0.92pp
| image7 = Lars Sponheim 1.jpg
| leader7 = Lars Sponheim
| party7 = Liberal Party of Norway
| last_election7 = 3.91%, 2 seats
| seats7 = 10
| seat_change7 = 8
| popular_vote7 = 156,113
| percentage7 = 5.92%
| swing7 = 2.01pp
| title = Prime Minister
| posttitle = Prime Minister after election
| before_election = Kjell Magne Bondevik
| before_party = Christian Democratic Party (Norway)
| after_election = Jens Stoltenberg
| after_party = Norwegian Labour Party
}}Parliamentary elections' were held in Norway on 11 and 12 September 2005. The result was a victory for the opposition centre-left Red-Green Coalition, which received 48.0% of the votes and won 87 out of 169 seats, dominated by the Labour Party's 61 seats. The three-party centre-right government coalition won 44 seats and the right wing Progress Party won 38, becoming the largest opposition party. Voter turnout was 77.1%, an increase of 2 percentage points compared to the 2001 elections.

Campaign
Before the election, Prime Minister Kjell Magne Bondevik led a coalition government consisting of the Conservative Party (38 seats in parliament), Christian People's Party (22 seats and supplied the prime minister) and the Liberals (2 seats), with the conditional support of the right-wing Progress Party. Between them, the three main parties of the coalition held 62 seats in the outgoing 165-seat Storting. The Progress Party held an additional 26, giving the four parties a majority when acting together.

Divisions within the coalition led to the temporary withdrawal of support by the Progress Party in November 2004, in response to what they saw as the government's underfunding of hospitals; an agreement was later reached. The government also attracted criticism for its handling of the 2004 Indian Ocean earthquake, in which several Norwegians died, with the prime minister admitting to mistakes in his government's delayed reaction to the disaster.

The question of private schools was controversial in 2005, with the opposition Labour Party, Socialist Left Party and Centre Party rejecting the government's plan to allow schools other than those offering an "alternative education", or those founded on religious beliefs, to become private.

Amidst a decline in the personal popularity of the prime minister, opinion polls in early 2005 indicated a clear lead for the Labour Party. Its leader, Jens Stoltenberg, was prime minister from March 2000 to October 2001, and enjoyed widespread public support in the run-up to the election. Polling suggests that the Labour, Socialist Left and Centre parties could form a red–green coalition, which would command a majority in the Storting. Labour and Socialist Left have pledged to maintain their allegiance with the Centre party even if the latter were not necessary to obtain a majority.

In June the leader of the Progress Party, Carl I. Hagen, said his party would not support a new coalition if Bondevik re-emerges as the prime minister after the election, implicitly pointing at Erna Solberg, leader of the conservative party as a better candidate.

A week before the elections, the Socialist Left Party experienced a fall in popularity on recent polls. The Liberals and Conservative Party gained popularity on the polls. As of 11 September 2005, the day before the election, the opinion polls indicated a dead run between the red-green coalition and the right wing.

Advance voting was possible from 10 August to 9 September. 452,488 votes were cast in advance, a decrease of approx 52,000 since the 2001 election.

Results

 Seat distribution 

Winners

The red-green coalition was the winner of the election and formed a majority government, with Jens Stoltenberg as prime minister, on 17 October 2005, as soon as a national budget for 2006 had been proposed by the old government.
The Labour Party obtained a result that brought it back into the position of "the largest Norwegian party, not just the largest of many middle-sized ones".
The Progress Party obtained its best result ever, surpassing the Conservatives by a large margin and becoming almost as large as the parties in the Bondevik government combined.
The Liberal Party gained a substantial number of seats in its most successful election since 1965. The large number of additional seats won with only a modest gain in votes came partly as a result of passing the threshold of 4% of the votes required for a party to be allocated leveling seats to bring their representation into proportion to the overall national vote (as opposed to direct regional mandates allocated on the basis of number of votes in the specific region). Venstre got six direct regional mandates and four allocated additional mandates.

Losers
Non-socialist parties suffered a defeat well beyond its numbers, with almost half of its votes for the Progress party, which had been able to offer only external support to the Bondevik government; the other parties shunned any possible formal inclusion in the government coalition over differing views in several issues.
The Socialist Left Party obtained only a disappointing result, after polls that showed the party well beyond 15% at times during the electoral campaign.
The Conservative Party lost a large share of votes and are no longer the largest non-Socialist party, surpassed by the Progress Party.
The Christian Democratic Party almost halved its votes, and suffered one of the worst defeats ever.
The Coastal Party lost its only representative in the parliament.
The Red Electoral Alliance did not manage to obtain a seat in the parliament.

References

Complete, official results from the website of the Norwegian parliament, stortinget.no, in Norwegian.
Leftist Coalition Seems to Be the Winner in Norway's Election. New York Times. September 13, 2005.
Bondevik bows out. Aftenposten. 13 September 2005.
Red-green alliance forges ahead. Aftenposten. 13 September 2005.
Labour gains in new poll. Aftenposten. 5 September 2005.
Labour stealing partner's votes. Aftenposten. 24 June 2005.
Hagen won't back Bondevik. Aftenposten. 20 June 2005.
Labour Down, Progress Party Surges in Norway. Angus Reid Consultants. 12 June 2005.
Norway — Red–Green Alliance could get majority. Angus Reid Consultants. Retrieved 5 June 2005.
Left wing alliance advances despite Labour retreat. Aftenposten. March 30, 2005.
Labour soars in latest poll. Aftenposten'', August 26, 2005.

Further reading

General elections in Norway
2000s elections in Norway
Norway
Parliamentary election
Norway